Castlecliff is a suburb of Whanganui, in the Whanganui District and Manawatū-Whanganui region of New Zealand's North Island.

Demographics

It had a population of 3,630 at the 2018 New Zealand census, an increase of 444 people (13.9%) since the 2013 census, and an increase of 210 people (6.1%) since the 2006 census. There were 1,341 households. There were 1,830 males and 1,797 females, giving a sex ratio of 1.02 males per female, with 861 people (23.7%) aged under 15 years, 678 (18.7%) aged 15 to 29, 1,584 (43.6%) aged 30 to 64, and 510 (14.0%) aged 65 or older.

Ethnicities were 70.0% European/Pākehā, 42.4% Māori, 4.7% Pacific peoples, 2.6% Asian, and 1.8% other ethnicities (totals add to more than 100% since people could identify with multiple ethnicities).

The proportion of people born overseas was 7.9%, compared with 27.1% nationally.

Although some people objected to giving their religion, 54.1% had no religion, 28.1% were Christian, 0.4% were Hindu, 0.5% were Buddhist and 8.8% had other religions.

Of those at least 15 years old, 234 (8.5%) people had a bachelor or higher degree, and 792 (28.6%) people had no formal qualifications. The employment status of those at least 15 was that 1,119 (40.4%) people were employed full-time, 369 (13.3%) were part-time, and 189 (6.8%) were unemployed.

Education

References 

Suburbs of Whanganui
Settlements on the Whanganui River